

References 

Additional sources
 
 

D

ca:Locució llatina#D
da:Latinske ord og vendinger#D
fr:Liste de locutions latines#D
id:Daftar frasa Latin#D
it:Locuzioni latine#D
nl:Lijst van Latijnse spreekwoorden en uitdrukkingen#D
pt:Lista de provérbios e sentenças em latim#D
ro:Listă de locuțiuni în limba latină#D
sl:Seznam latinskih izrekov#D
sv:Lista över latinska ordspråk och talesätt#D